Roncalli High School may refer to:

Roncalli High School (Indiana), school in Indianapolis, Indiana
Roncalli High School (South Dakota), school in Aberdeen, South Dakota
Roncalli High School (Wisconsin), school in Manitowoc, Wisconsin

See also 
Roncalli Catholic High School, school in Omaha, Nebraska